Allowrie, an electoral district of the Legislative Assembly in the Australian state of New South Wales, was created in 1904 and abolished in 1920. The only member for Allowrie was Mark Morton.


Election results

Elections in the 1910s

1917

Sitting MP Mark Morton was returned with a slightly increased majority.  The Liberal Reform Party merged into the Nationalist Party prior to the election.

1913

Sitting Liberal Reform MP Mark Morton was returned with a reduced majority defeating Labor's Charles Craig for a second time.

Elections in the 1900s

1910

Sitting Liberal Reform MP Mark Morton was returned with an increased majority on his 1904 electoral win.

1907

1904

References

New South Wales state electoral results by district